Al-Sisiniyah (also spelled Sisnyeh) is a town in northwestern Syria, administratively part of the Tartus Governorate, located southeast of Tartus. Nearby localities include Safita to the north, al-Bariqiyah to the northeast, Habnamrah and Marmarita to the east, al-Zarah to the southeast, al-Tulay'i to the southwest, Buwaydet al-Suwayqat to the west and Beit al-Shaykh Yunes to the northwest. According to the Syria Central Bureau of Statistics (CBS), al-Sisiniyah had a population of 2,667 in the 2004 census. It is the administrative center of the al-Sisiniyah nahiyah ("sub-district") which consisted of 19 localities with a collective population of 22,018 in 2004. The town's inhabitants are a mix of Alawites and Christians, with each community having its own mukhtar ("village head").

References

Towns in Syria
Populated places in Safita District
Alawite communities in Syria
Eastern Orthodox Christian communities in Syria